John Christopher Drumgoole (August 15, 1816 – March 28, 1888) was an Irish American Roman Catholic priest who was known for his work in caring for and educating orphaned and abandoned children in New York City, especially homeless newsboys.

In 1883, he founded Mount Loretto, an orphanage and vocational school for boys in a then-rural section of Staten Island which later grew into a large complex that housed and educated thousands of boys and girls in more than a century of existence. As of 2015, the organization that Drumgoole founded continued to run programs that benefit needy children on a portion of the Mount Loretto property.

Life

John Christopher Drumgoole was born at Abbeylara near Granard, County Longford, Ireland, on August 15, 1816. His father, a cobbler, died in 1822. John came to the United States at the age of 9 to join his mother, who had emigrated previously. His mother worked as a maid. John became a shoemaker to help support her. In 1844, he became sexton/janitor of St. Mary's, New York City's third Roman Catholic parish, founded in 1826 and located in the poor Lower East Side neighborhood. Drumgoole grew concerned for the many homeless and orphaned children who lived on the streets of New York City after the Great Famine in Ireland and then the American Civil War in the United States. For 21 years, he provided shelter for many of them in the basement of the church.

Drumgoole became a United States citizen in 1838. He had long wished to enter the priesthood, but waited until provision could be made for his mother. In 1863, he commenced his studies, first at St. John's College in Rose Hill, and then at St. Francis Xavier's. He entered the Seminary of Our Lady of Angels, near Niagara Falls, in 1865. He was ordained 1869, aged 53.

In 1871, he was placed in charge of the "Newsboys' Lodging House", an old warehouse located at 53 Warren Street in Manhattan that the St. Vincent de Paul Society converted into sleeping quarters. Under his leadership, this program expanded, and he soon found the building inadequate for the needs of his newsboy charges. Seeking funds to build a larger home for newsboys, he founded a new organization, the St. Joseph's Union, and began publishing The Homeless Child and Messenger of St. Joseph's Union. People from all over the world purchased subscriptions to this publication for 25 cents per year and thereby became members of the union. It was with these funds that he was able to build a new mission house at the corner of Great Jones and Lafayette streets, which came to be known as the Mission of the Immaculate Virgin. 

The cornerstone of the Manhattan building was laid in 1879. The plot of land, which was previously occupied by a Protestant church, cost $70,000 and the building cost $160,000 to build. It was occupied by 1881.

Mount Loretto

Although the building was designed to provide light and air to each resident so as to avoid the spread of influenza and tuberculosis, then-common in the tenements, Drumgoole came to feel that the general environment of the City at the time was not healthy for the younger children, so he sought out a more rural setting. 

In 1882, he purchased land on Staten Island and founded the Mission of the Immaculate Virgin at Mount Loretto, which he named as a tribute to the Sisters who accompanied him there to teach the children. Mount Loretto was designed to be a self-sufficient farm.

In 1891 the Mount Loretto Spur, a mile long branch of the Staten Island Railway was built to bring construction material to the Mount Loretto site. Every third Sunday until 1939, the SIRT operated a special train from St. George to Mount Loretto for relatives and visitors. The stop was called "Mission Station".

The Church of St. Joachim and St. Anne was constructed in 1891 on the grounds of Mount Loretto, to serve the children and staff of the institution. Drumgoole introduced vocational training at the Mission. Children at the St. Joseph’s School at Mt. Loretto learned shoe making, woodworking, baking and printing. They grew their own food, and raised live stock and poultry. The herd of cows were the last cows in New York City when they were sold in 1961. Drumgoole also organized a brass band.

Death
Drumgoole used to divide his time between the mission's facilities in Manhattan and at Mount Loretto. On Sunday, March 11, 1888, he boarded a Staten Island Rapid Transit train at the Pleasant Plains station, very near the orphanage, and rode it to the ferry to Manhattan at St. George. Upon arriving, he found that no ferries were running because the Great Blizzard of 1888 had begun and was causing wind gusts that may have exceeded 80 miles per hour in some places. To return to Mount Loretto, he hired a horse and gig and drove through blizzard. Though he arrived safely, he soon developed a cold that later progressed to pneumonia, even though he continued to work. He collapsed on March 28, while preparing to say Mass at the mission's building in Manhattan. Drumgoole's will left everything he had to the mission.

Legacy

Drumgoole was a hero of the newsboys who thronged the area when Park Row was the headquarters of New York City's major newspapers, including The New York Times, and was considered an unofficial patron saint of the homeless, orphans, and the less fortunate. In 1894, a statue was erected in Drumgoole's honor at Lafayette Street, the site of the Manhattan Mission. It was later moved to Mount Loretto in 1920. The Mission of the Immaculate Virgin has been on its current site in the Pleasant Plains section of Staten Island since 1883. Mount Loretto, an orphanage for boys and later girls as well, was run by the mission for many years. The Mission of the Immaculate Virgin continues to provide a variety of social services.

In tribute to Drumgoole, Drumgoole Plaza, a New York City park, is named in his honor, as are the service roads (Drumgoole Road West/East) of the Korean War Veterans Parkway on Staten Island. In 1973, Public School 36 was named the J.C. Drumgoole School. The Catholic Church considers him a candidate for sainthood.

See also
 Mount Loretto Unique Area
 Protectory#New York Catholic Protectory

References

External links
Mount Loretto official website
Reminiscences of Mt. Loretto in the 1950s, includes some historic information

1816 births
1888 deaths
Adoption, fostering, orphan care and displacement
American anti-poverty advocates
Children's rights activists
People from County Longford
People from Manhattan
People from Staten Island
Roman Catholic activists
19th-century American Roman Catholic priests
Irish emigrants to the United States (before 1923)
People of the Roman Catholic Archdiocese of New York